Valmir Bajram Sulejmani (born 1 February 1996) is a professional footballer who plays as a forward for  club Ingolstadt 04. Born in Germany, he represents the Kosovo national team at international level.

Club career

Hannover 96

Youth career
Sulejmani started his youth career at Hannover 96's academy at age nine. During the 2012–13 season he played for Hannover U-19 youth team in the Under 19 Bundesliga making seven appearances and scoring one goal in 5–2 win against Holstein Kiel U-19 team on 12 May 2013. He started the 2013–14 season on 11 August 2013, playing against Rot-Weiss Erfurt U-19 in the loss 3–1. He managed to score two goals that season: the first came a week after the season's opening match, on 18 August 2013 in 4–2 win against St. Pauli U-19 the second on 1 September 2013 in a 4–1 win against Hamburger SV U-19. Sulejmani finished playing the 2013–14 season with total of six appearances and two goals scored and made his debut with Hannover 96 II on 19 October 2013 against Victoria Hamburg playing as a starter in a 2–0 away victory.

First team
Sulejmani played on 26 October 2013 in the 9–2 defeat by Hannover 96 II of Werder Bremen II before he was called up to Hannover 96's first team for the match against Werder Bremen on 3 November 2013, where he was an unused substitute. He made his debut for Hannover 96 at age 17, on 14 December 2013, in the match against Nürnberg, replacing Artur Sobiech in the 74th minute.  Hannover came back from 3–0 down to draw 3–3, with Sulejmani assisting on Hannover's second goal scored by Mame Diouf in 87th minute. In the next fixture against SC Freiburg on 21 December 2013, Sulejmani was included in the starting line up, playing the first half of the match before being substituted off for Artur Sobiech, as the match finished in a 2–1 loss.

Loan to Union Berlin
On 29 January 2015, Sulejmani was loaned to the 2. Bundesliga side Union Berlin until the end of the 2014–15 season as a replacement for long injured Maximilian Thiel, rejoining head coach Norbert Düwel, who had previously been assistant coach at Hannover 96.

International

Germany

Under-17
Between 2012 and 2013, Sulejmani has played five matches for the Germany U17.

Albania

Under-21
Sulejmani revealed to the Albanian sports media that he had been in contact with FSHF and was available for selection by the Albania, given his Albanian background, despite having played for Germany at the youth level. On the other hand, Albania's coach, Gianni de Biasi, declared that Sulejmani is in his plans.

On 1 August 2014, the Albania national under-21 football team's coach Skënder Gega declared that he has invited Sulejmani to join the Albania national U21 team for the friendly match on 6 August 2014 against Qatar U-20. Two days later, on 3 August 2014, the media reported that his club Hannover 96 had not given him permission to play for the Albania U-21, but Sulejmani himself declared that he would be part of the team in future matches. On 1 October 2014, Sulejmani received another call-up from Albania under-21 for the friendly match against Romania U21, but declined the invitation.

Kosovo

Senior
On 7 October 2015, Sulejmani received a call-up from Kosovo for a friendly match against Equatorial Guinea coming on as a substitute in the 57th minute for Mërgim Brahimi.

Under-21
On 5 June 2017, Sulejmani received his first call-up from the Kosovo U21 team when he was named to the starting line-up for a 2019 UEFA European Under-21 Championship qualification match against the Norwegian U21 team.

Career statistics

Club

International

References

External links

1996 births
Living people
Footballers from Hanover
German people of Kosovan descent
German people of Albanian descent
Kosovo Albanians
Kosovan footballers
Kosovo international footballers
Kosovo youth international footballers
Kosovo under-21 international footballers
German footballers
Germany youth international footballers
Association football midfielders
Association football forwards
Hannover 96 players
Hannover 96 II players
1. FC Union Berlin players
SV Waldhof Mannheim players
FC Ingolstadt 04 players
Bundesliga players
2. Bundesliga players
Regionalliga players
3. Liga players